António Domingos Abreu Rocha (born 20 June 1938 in Belém, Lisbon) is a Portuguese fado singer. He recorded with Beatriz da Conceição for Paul Van Nevel with the Huelgas Ensemble.

References

1938 births
Portuguese fado singers
Living people